There are 100 Grade I listed buildings in Bristol, England according to Bristol City Council. The register includes many structures which for convenience are grouped together in the list below.

In the United Kingdom, the term listed building refers to a building or other structure officially designated as being of special architectural, historical or cultural significance; Grade I structures are those considered to be "buildings of exceptional interest". Listing was begun by a provision in the Town and Country Planning Act 1947. Listing a building imposes severe restrictions on what the owner might wish to change or modify in the structure or its fittings. In England, the authority for listing under the Planning (Listed Buildings and Conservation Areas) Act 1990 rests with Historic England, a non-departmental public body sponsored by the Department for Culture, Media and Sport, while local authorities have a responsibility to regulate and enforce the planning regulations.

The oldest Grade I listed buildings in Bristol are religious. St James' Priory was founded in 1129 as a Benedictine priory by Robert, Earl of Gloucester, the illegitimate son of Henry I. The building is on the Historic England Buildings at Risk Register and described as being in very bad condition. The second oldest is The Cathedral Church of the Holy and Undivided Trinity which is more commonly known as Bristol Cathedral and its associated Gatehouse. Founded in 1140, the church became the seat of the bishop and cathedral of the new Diocese of Bristol in 1542. Most of the medieval stonework, particularly the Elder Lady Chapel, is made from limestone taken from quarries around Dundry and Felton with Bath stone being used in other areas. Amongst the other churches included in the list is the 12th century St Mary Redcliffe which is the tallest building in Bristol. The church was described by Queen Elizabeth I as "the fairest, goodliest, and most famous parish church in England." The New Room was built in 1739 by John Wesley and is the oldest Methodist chapel in the world.

Secular buildings include The Red Lodge which was built in 1580 for John Yonge as a lodge for a Great House, which once stood on the site of the present Colston Hall. It was subsequently added to in Georgian times and restored in the early 20th century. It has had several uses in its past, including hosting the country's first girls' reform school in 1854. It is open to the public as a branch of Bristol City Museum and Art Gallery. Other manor houses include the 18th century Kings Weston House and Goldney Hall where the highly decorated Grotto dates from 1739. Commercial buildings such as paired Exchange and Old Post Office from the 1740s are also included in the list. Residential buildings in the Georgian Portland Square and the complex of small cottages around a green at Blaise Hamlet. Blaise Hamlet was built around 1811 for retired employees of Quaker banker and philanthropist John Scandrett Harford, who owned Blaise Castle House. The 18th century industrial structures of Isambard Kingdom Brunel are represented in the list by the Clifton Suspension Bridge, Avon Bridge and the Bristol Old Station which formed the original Bristol Temple Meads railway station.

Buildings

|}

|}

Notes

References

See also 
 Buildings and architecture of Bristol
 Grade II* listed buildings in Bristol
 Grade II listed buildings in Bristol
 :Category:Grade I listed buildings in Bristol

External links

 
Bristol

Lists of listed buildings in Bristol